Borj Lalla Qadiya is a fort in the city of Rabat, Morocco. It is believed to be first built in the 17th century next to the tomb of a saint woman called Lalla Qdiya. It forms an important part of the walls protecting the city from northeast.

References

Forts in Morocco
16th-century fortifications

'Alawi architecture